Kedar Singh Rawat is an Indian politician and member of the Bharatiya Janata Party. Rawat is a second time member of the Uttarakhand Legislative Assembly from the Yamunotri constituency in Uttarkashi district. He has been an MLA from 2007-2012  and has presently won for a second time in 2017 from Yamunotri.

He has been active in political life since  college days when he was elected the general secretary from DAV college Dehradun.

He has been a successful lawyer before quitting practice and contesting elections since 2002 when  Uttarakhand first went into elections.

References 

People from Uttarkashi district
Bharatiya Janata Party politicians from Uttarakhand
Members of the Uttarakhand Legislative Assembly
Living people
Uttarakhand MLAs 2017–2022
Year of birth missing (living people)